Training and Education in Professional Psychology is a peer-reviewed academic journal published by the American Psychological Association on behalf of the Association of Psychology Postdoctoral and Internship Centers. It was established in 2006 and "is dedicated to enhancing supervision and training provided by psychologists." The current editor-in-chief is Michael C. Roberts of the University of Kansas.

Abstracting and indexing 
The journal is abstracted and indexed by the Social Sciences Citation Index. According to the Journal Citation Reports, the journal has a 2020 impact factor of 1.563.

References

External links 
 

American Psychological Association academic journals
English-language journals
Publications established in 2006
Quarterly journals
Education journals